The following is an Eastern Armenian verb table.  The Western Armenian verb table can be found here.

Conjugations

Affirmative/Interrogative

Type I/II

(This conjugation is termed "I/II" to coincide with historic/Western numbering, where there are still three distinct conjugations)

Note that traditional Armenian grammars use Aorist for Preterite and Optative for Subjunctive. In Armenian, gerunds / gerundives / converbs (verbal noun) are interchangeable with an English relative clause. For example,

նամակ գրող մարդը namak groġ mardë - The man who is writing a letter / The man writing a letter (there is only a present tense gerund in English)

նամակ գրած մարդը namak grac mardë - The man who has written a letter

մարդու գրելիք նամակը mardu grelik’ namakë - The letter that the man will write (roughly, "the man's will-be written letter")

Additionally, the synchronical gerund or present participle II denotes a simultaneous action. In other words, a concurrency between two verbs:

Ես վազելիս ընկա yes vazelis ënka - I fell while running

Note: the Conditional mood is sometimes labeled the Hypothetical mood; in the Necessative, պետք է petk’ ē is used as a stronger form of պիտի piti; and that resultive constructions are not moods. They convey a state as a result from a prior action. Compare:

նստում եմ nstum em, I am sitting down, and նստած եմ nstac em, I am sitting.

կառուցվում է kaṙuc’voum ē, it is getting built, and կառուցված է kaṙuc’vac ē, it is built.

Type III

(This conjugation is termed "III" (instead of "II") to coincide with historic/Western numbering, where there are still three distinct conjugations)

Negative

Type I

Note: the formation of the negative is the same for all conjugations.  The examples below are based on the first conjugation.

Note: the negative jussive forms may also be (in Eastern Armenian) ch'piti sirem, ch'piti sires, etc; ch'piti sirei, ch'piti sireir, etc.

Armenian language